Ruislip Manor is a London Underground station in Ruislip Manor in west London. The station is on the Uxbridge branch of both the Metropolitan line and Piccadilly line, between Eastcote and Ruislip stations. The station is located on Victoria Road, where the line crosses on a bridge: there are two curved entrances, with access to the platforms being by stairways. It is in Travelcard Zone 6. The closest station on the Central line is Ruislip Gardens.

History

The Metropolitan Railway (Harrow and Uxbridge Railway) constructed the line through Ruislip Manor between Harrow on the Hill and Uxbridge and commenced services on 4 July 1904 with, initially, the only intermediate stop being at Ruislip. At first, services were operated by steam trains, but track electrification was completed in the subsequent months and electric trains began operating on 1 January 1905.

On 1 March 1910, an extension of the District line from South Harrow to connect with the Metropolitan Railway at Rayners Lane was opened enabling District line trains to serve stations between Rayners Lane and Uxbridge from that date.

Progressive development in the west Middlesex area over the next two decades lead to the gradual opening of additional stations along the Uxbridge branch to encourage the growth of new residential areas. Ruislip Manor opened on 5 August 1912 as Ruislip Manor Halt.

On 23 October 1933 District line services were replaced by Piccadilly line trains.

During the 1930s the number of passengers using the station increased greatly - from 17,000 in 1931 to 1.25m in 1937. To serve this enlarged number, a rebuilt station was opened on 26 June 1938.

The station was given a major overhaul during 2005–2006. Both platforms were sequentially rebuilt, resulting in trains not stopping at each platform for a period of approximately four months. Work was completed in Autumn 2006. Local Green Party members commented that improved disability access has not been included in this overhaul. The station has a seemingly above average number of stairs up to the platforms, as the station is raised a significant amount above street-height in order to allow tall vehicles to pass beneath the station bridge, which is immediately before the station.

Services

Metropolitan line 
The Metropolitan Line is the only line to operate an express service, though currently for Metropolitan Line trains on the Uxbridge branch this is eastbound only in the morning peaks (06:30 to 09:30) Monday to Friday.

The off-peak service in trains per hour (tph) is:
 8tph Eastbound to Aldgate via Baker Street (all stations)
 8tph Westbound to Uxbridge

The morning peak service in trains per hour (tph) is:
 2tph Eastbound to Aldgate via Baker Street (semi-fast)
 4tph Eastbound to Aldgate via Baker Street (all stations)
 4tph Eastbound to Baker Street (all stations)
 10tph Westbound to Uxbridge

The evening peak service in trains per hour (tph) is:
 7tph Eastbound to Aldgate via Baker Street (all stations)
 3tph Eastbound to Baker Street (all stations)
 10tph Westbound to Uxbridge

Piccadilly line

Between Rayners Lane and Uxbridge there is no Piccadilly Line service before approximately 06:30 (Monday - Friday) and 08:45 (Saturday - Sunday), except for one early morning
departure from Uxbridge at 05:18 (Monday - Saturday) and 06:46 (Sunday).

The off-peak service in trains per hour (tph) is:
 3tph Eastbound to Cockfosters
 3tph Westbound to Uxbridge

The peak time service in trains per hour (tph) is:
 6tph Eastbound to Cockfosters
 6tph Westbound to Uxbridge

Connections
London Buses routes 114, H13 and 398 serve the station.

References

External links
 

 
 
 

Former Metropolitan Railway stations
Metropolitan line stations
Piccadilly line stations
Railway stations in Great Britain opened in 1912
Tube stations in the London Borough of Hillingdon
1912 establishments in England